The 1896 United States presidential election in Iowa took place on November 3, 1896. All contemporary 45 states were part of the 1896 United States presidential election. Voters chose 13 electors to the Electoral College, which selected the president and vice president.

Iowa voted for the Republican nominees, former Ohio Governor William McKinley and his running mate Garret Hobart of New Jersey, over the Populist nominees, former Representative William Jennings Bryan, and former Representative Thomas E. Watson.

McKinley won 55.47% of the vote to Bryan's 42.90%. Bryan's performance in Iowa was the worst performance for a Democratic candidate since 1880. McKinley both became the first Republican to win over 55% of the popular vote, and the first to win multiple counties that hadn't voted for the Republican candidate since 1880. This was also the first election since 1864 in which Iowa voted more Republican than neighboring Minnesota.

Background
By 1896, incumbent president Grover Cleveland was eligible to run for a second consecutive term (third overall), however he had declined. People had begun losing money during the panic of 1893, and blamed Cleveland for it, which was a big blow for the Democrats. This left the Democratic nomination open to multiple candidates. Eventually, William Jennings Bryan had won both the Democratic nomination, and the endorsement of the Populist nomination. In Iowa, Bryan had uniquely ran under the Populist party, with Thomas E. Watson as his running mate.

Results

Results by county

See also
 United States presidential elections in Iowa

Notes

References

Iowa
1896
1896 Iowa elections